Stella’s Place is a Toronto youth mental health charity.  It is the only youth mental health charity in Toronto that provides services for people aged between 18 and 29 years.

Organization and activities 
Stella's Place is a youth mental health hub located in Toronto that provides free counselling, psychiatry, mentoring and employment support services to about 800 youth annually. It is the only youth mental health charity in Toronto that provides services for people aged between 18 and 29 years.

Therapy provided by the peer-counsellors includes an adapted dialectical behavior therapy program.

The organization was founded in 2013 by Donna Green and moved to a larger location Toronto's Queen West area in 2020. Green opened the charity after struggling to find support for the mental health needs of her daughter, Stella.

The center works in partnership with City of Toronto and is funded by the federal government of Canada.

References 

2013 establishments in Ontario
Health charities in Canada
Mental health organizations in Canada
Non-profit organizations based in Toronto
Youth organizations based in Canada